Kathleen Rollo (born 30 October 1951) is a Canadian diver. She competed in the women's 10 metre platform event at the 1972 Summer Olympics.

Career
Rollo had never taken much interest in diving until around 1964, when she was spotted by her would-be coach Ross Hetherton, diving at the Varsity Pool with some university students and he asked her to join his diving team in Saskatoon. At that time, the only other woman diver on the team was Kathy McDonald. In 1966, she came third on the springboard event at the British Empire Games trials and bettered that in the Pan American Games trials by coming second. During the 1967 Pan American Games in Winnipeg, she came fourth in the diving event. Between 1966–1969, Rollo was the women's provincial diving champion following the departure of McDonald and in 1968 won the Alberta women's diving championship in Calgary.

By the age of 18, Rollo had been competitively diving for six years, having spent that time training with the Y-Optimist Diving Club under coach Ross Hetherington. She was described in 1969 as "either the second or third best woman diver in Canada" and was considered at that time to have a very high chance of securing a position on the Olympic team. As a diver, Rollo participated in both the springboard and high tower events, although had to travel to Edmonton or Winnipeg to train due to lack of facilities where she lived, incurring travel and lodgings costs.

Rollo set the 1972 Summer Olympics at her final goal, having expressed a desire to take up coaching to younger divers after the event.

Personal

When in grades 9 and 10, she attended the Little Flower Academy school in Vancouver to be closer to her coach Ross Hethertington when he moved to the area. By grade 12, she was attending Aden Bowman Collegiate. She began studying nursing in 1970. In the early 1970s, she moved to Regina and married Head of mission Don Seaman.

References

1951 births
Living people
Canadian female divers
Olympic divers of Canada
Divers at the 1972 Summer Olympics
Commonwealth Games competitors for Canada
Divers at the 1970 British Commonwealth Games
Pan American Games competitors for Canada
Divers at the 1967 Pan American Games
People from Warroad, Minnesota
20th-century Canadian women